The 1966 Harelbeke–Antwerp–Harelbeke was the ninth edition of the E3 Harelbeke cycle race and was held on 26 March 1966. The race started and finished in Harelbeke. The race was won by Rik Van Looy.

General classification

Notes

References

1966 in Belgian sport
1966